Ugo Humbert was the defending champion but chose not to defend his title.

Roman Safiullin won the title after defeating Roberto Marcora 6–4, 6–2 in the final.

Seeds
All seeds receive a bye into the second round.

Draw

Finals

Top half

Section 1

Section 2

Bottom half

Section 3

Section 4

References

External links
Main draw
Qualifying draw

2020 ATP Challenger Tour
2020 Singles